was a Japanese swimmer and TV actress. She competed at the 1964 Olympics in the 100 m backstroke, 4 × 100 m freestyle relay and 4 × 100 m medley relay and finished fourth in the medley relay. After retiring from swimming, Kihara became a model, businesswoman and TV actress, playing in several Japanese TV series in the 1970s–80s. In 2005, she was appointed as director of the Japan Swimming Federation. She died of subarachnoid hemorrhage at age 59.

References 

1948 births
2007 deaths
Japanese television actresses
Olympic swimmers of Japan
Swimmers at the 1964 Summer Olympics
Asian Games medalists in swimming
Swimmers at the 1966 Asian Games
Asian Games gold medalists for Japan
Medalists at the 1966 Asian Games
Universiade medalists in swimming
Universiade bronze medalists for Japan
Medalists at the 1967 Summer Universiade
Japanese female freestyle swimmers
20th-century Japanese women